The koncovka is a Slovak duct-blown overtone fipple flute without finger holes, traditionally played by shepherds. The koncovka is played by closing and opening the bottom hole of the flute. By increasing the air speed, two different harmonic series of notes can be played with the end either open or closed. Traditional koncovka melodies use the partial Lydian scale available on this instrument.

See also

 Fujara, another Slovak overtone-based shephards flute
 Willow flute, a Scandinavian overtone-based folk flute

References

External links

Fipple flutes
Overtone flutes
Slovak musical instruments
Russian musical instruments
Ukrainian musical instruments